Toners Lake is a lake in Waseca County, in the U.S. state of Minnesota.

Toners Lake was named for Richard Toner, a pioneer blacksmith.

References

Lakes of Minnesota
Lakes of Waseca County, Minnesota